The first season of Hawthorne, premiered on TNT on June 16, 2009. The season contains 10 episodes and concluded airing on August 18, 2009.

Season synopsis 
Season one  shows Christina dealing with financial issues at Richmond Trinity Hospital (where she is Chief Nursing Officer), dealing with her rebellious daughter and coming to terms with her recently deceased husband, Michael. We are introduced to her closest friends and to Tom Wakefield, a doctor who once took care of her ailing husband and harbors feelings for her.

Cast

Main cast 
 Jada Pinkett Smith as Christina Hawthorne, Chief Nursing Officer of Richmond Trinity
 Michael Vartan as Dr. Tom Wakefield, M.D., Chief of Surgery of Richmond Trinity
 David Julian Hirsh as Nurse Ray Stein
 Suleka Mathew as Nurse Bobbie Jackson, Richmond Trinity ER RN Charge Nurse
 Christina Moore as Nurse Candy Sullivan
 Hannah Hodson as Camille Hawthorne

Recurring cast 
 Vanessa Lengies as Nurse Kelly Epson
 Aisha Hinds as Isabel Walsh
 Jillian Armenante as Richmond Trinity Charge Nurse Cheryl Brooks
 Joanna Cassidy as Amanda Hawthorne, Richmond Trinity Board Member
 James Morrison as John Morrissey, CEO of Richmond Trinity
 D.B. Woodside as David Gendler
 Rebecca Field as Susan Winters, Richmond Trinity Social Worker
 Anne Ramsay as Dr. Brenda Marshall

Production 
John Masius created the program and served as executive producer for the first season. Glen Mazzara also served as executive producer for the first season. The program was initially going to be called Time Heals. Megan Branman and Dylann Brander of Branman/Brander Casting were involved in casting for the program. In September 2008, Jamie Tarses was reported to be an executive producer on the program.

In September 2008, The Press of Atlantic City reported that Jada Pinkett Smith signed on as both the star of the television pilot, and to serve as executive producer of the program. Pinkett Smith had previously promised never to work in television again, but changed her mind after reading the script of the pilot. She recalled getting the script from her manager: "He said, 'I would never send this to you if I didn't think it was fantastic.' I read it and then I let my husband read it. (Will) said to take the meeting and see." She decided to return to television because of the show's unique qualities.

In the pilot, Jeffrey Nordling portrayed Dr. Tom Wakefield, director of medicine. In February 2009, Michael Vartan was cast to co-star alongside Pinkett Smith as Dr. Tom Wakefield in the series. By June 6, 2009, the program's title had been changed to Hawthorne.

Episodes

References 

2009 American television seasons